Shangan may refer to:
Shengan, a village in Lorestan Province, Iran
Shang'an, a township in China